Barenis is a village in Chitral District in the Khyber Pakhtunkhwa province of Pakistan.

See also 

 Chitral District

References

External links
Khyber-Pakhtunkhwa Government website section on Lower Dir
United Nations

Chitral District
Tehsils of Chitral District
Union councils of Khyber Pakhtunkhwa
Populated places in Chitral District
Union councils of Chitral District